Kim Sung-du (born March 1, 1958) is a politician of the Democratic People's Republic of Korea. He is a member of the 7th convocation of the Central Committee of the Workers' Party of Korea.

Biography
Born in North Hamgyong Province, he was appointed as the chair of the Board of Education in March 2012 after the Dean of the College of Science. He served as the Chairman of the Korea-Cuba Unity Committee, the National Sports Leadership Committee, and the Korea-Egypt Friendship Association. In May 2016, he was appointed a member of the 7th Central Committee of the Workers' Party of Korea at the 7th Congress of the Workers' Party of Korea. In September 2009, he was elected to the 12th convocation of the Supreme People's Assembly, and in 2014 once again, to the 13th convocation, representing the 328th electoral district (Changryon).

References

Members of the Supreme People's Assembly
1958 births
Living people
Members of the 8th Central Committee of the Workers' Party of Korea